Gilbert Verdié (Decazeville, 29 June 1928 - Albi, 25 November 2015) was a French rugby league player who represented France in two Rugby League World Cups.

Biography 
Gilbert Verdié, then playing in Albi, was called upon to compete in the first edition of the 1954 Rugby League World Cup which took place in France. He participated in two edition meetings including the final against Great Britain on 13 November 1954 at the Parc des Princes in Paris in front of 30,368 spectators but could not prevent Great Britain from raising their first World Cup title.

References

1928 births
2015 deaths
French rugby league players
France national rugby league team players
Racing Club Albi XIII players
Rugby league second-rows
Sportspeople from Aveyron